Juan Carlos Almada (born May 15, 1965) is an Argentine football manager and former player who played for clubs in Argentina, Chile and Ecuador.

Titles
 Universidad Católica 1993 (runner-up Copa Libertadores)
 Emelec 1994 (Ecuadorian Championship)

External links
 
 

1965 births
Living people
Argentine people of Portuguese descent
Argentine footballers
Argentine expatriate footballers
Defensa y Justicia footballers
Club Almagro players
Olimpo footballers
C.S. Emelec footballers
Cobreloa footballers
C.D. Arturo Fernández Vial footballers
Deportes Concepción (Chile) footballers
Club Deportivo Universidad Católica footballers
Chilean Primera División players
Expatriate footballers in Chile
Expatriate footballers in Ecuador
Association football defenders
Argentine football managers
Defensa y Justicia managers
Footballers from Buenos Aires